The 1927 Klass I season was the fifth season of the Klass I, the top level of ice hockey in Sweden. This was the last season of the Klass I, it was replaced by the Elitserien for 1927–28. IK Göta won the league championship.

Final standings

External links
1927 season

Swedish
1
Klass I seasons